Hibbertia acaulothrix is a species of flowering plant in the family Dilleniaceae and is endemic to New South Wales. It is an erect shrub with lance-shaped leaves and yellow flowers arranged singly, with nine to thirteen stamens arranged around the carpels.

Description
Flowering has been recorded from October to April.

Taxonomy
Hibbertia acaulothrix was first formally described in 2012 by Hellmut R. Toelken in the Journal of the Adelaide Botanic Gardens from specimens collected by John D. Briggs near Bemboka in 1986. The specific epithet (acaulothrix) means "stalkless hair", referring to the hairs of this species compared to those of the similar Hibbertia hermanniifolia.

Distribution and habitat
This hibbertia grows on sedimentary rocks in woodland between Wollemi National Park and south to the Wadbilliga National Park.

See also
List of Hibbertia species

References

acaulothrix
Flora of New South Wales
Plants described in 2012
Taxa named by Hellmut R. Toelken